Mosul is a city in northern Iraq.

Mosul may also refer to:

Places

Iraq
 Mosul Governorate, a governorate
 Mosul Province, Ottoman Empire, a former administrative division
 Mosul International Airport

Other places
 Mosul, Azerbaijan, a village in Azerbaijan

Films
 Mosul (2019 documentary film), a film by Dan Gabriel about the battle to reclaim the Iraqi city of Mosul from the Islamic State
 Mosul (2019 action film), a war film by Matthew Michael Carnahan about Nineveh Swat Team's fight against ISIS

Other uses
 University of Mosul, public university located in Mosul, Iraq
 Moșul (mythology), European mythology
 Battle of Mosul (disambiguation), several historical battles taken place in or near Mosul, Iraq
 Mosul FC, Iraqi football club based in Mosul, Iraq

See also
 Chaldean Catholic Archeparchy of Mosul, a diocese located in the city of Mosul, Iraq
 Mosul Dam, Iraq
 Musul (disambiguation)